Mariana Barreiros Dos Santos Gonçalves (born 10 July 1999), better known for her stage name, April Ivy, is a Portuguese singer-songwriter.

Since the age of 9, she has been getting a taste of the artistic world, either giving voice to Disney characters (Toy Story 3, Tangled, Minnie & You, etc.) or in the art of acting. With international training, she participated in several workshops in Portugal, Switzerland, Norway and England. It was also at this age that she started having both piano and voice lessons and formed her first band where she was the lead vocalist and guitar player (Flames on Fire). As a result of studying at St.Julians School ever since she was three years old until the age of 18, April feels her emotions in English. She then got a degree in Marketing and Advertisement at IADE - Universidade Europeia , whilst pursuing her musical career. Through her piano and guitar compositions, she is the writer and performer of her own songs, as well as composing for other artists.

Career 
She began her artistic career at the young age of 10 where she voiced the character 'Molly' for the Portuguese version of the Disney Movie 'Toy Story 3'. That was her first professional encounter to a studio and the artistic scene. Following that, she did the voice over for Disney productions 'Tangled' and 'Molly and Me'.

Her passion for music spoke louder as April began performing at the age of 9 with her band 'Flames on Fire', where she was the guitarist and lead singer. The band would perform at school events and parties, and April (or Mariana at the time) would sell their merchandise to parents and friends. One year after, she was posting covers and original songs both on Youtube and Spotify.  At the age of 14 as a school project, she did an internship at Portugal's radio station company for a week Grupo Renascença Multimedia, where she was scouted by Mega Hits’ director, Nelson Cunha.

April began her career at the tender age of 16 with her first single "Be Ok" as an independent artist. Composing and performing the song, she reached  the top of national radio airplay list, as well as the top of national Spotify, YouTube and iTunes charts. In sales, the single reached the top 100 of the national charts debuting and peaking in 1st as well as being part of a Portuguese television teen series "Massa Fresca" soundtrack. Later in June 2016, she signed her first international deal with Universal Music France.  Thanks to her chart-topping single 'Be Ok' , April was then invited to perform at the Santa Casa Stage of the 2016 MEO Sudoeste. Later in November 2016, her song "Shut Up" soundtracked the Portuguese telenovela "A Impostora" .

April was nominated for Best Portuguese Act in the 2016 MTV EMA, as well as was nominated for Best Newcomer in the 2017 Golden Globes (Portugal) ending up losing to the actress Beatriz Frazão. April won the award Best Newcomer in the 2016 "Melhores do Ano" gala by Radio Nova Era.

On 5 August 2017 during her summer tour, April performed at the main stage, MEO Stage, of the 2017 MEO Sudoeste.

On 19 July 2019 she released her first album "game.of.love" which included her first six singles plus four new songs. The album was edited by Warner Music Portugal.

Personal life 
Mariana Barreiros dos Santos Gonçalves was born and raised in Lisbon, Portugal. Whilst her mother's Portuguese, but with Italian origins, her father is from Lisbon. Mariana's the middle child of two brothers, João Miguel aged 14, and Miguel aged 24. She studied at St.Julians School since the age of three, until college, where she got a degree in Marketing and Advertisement at IADE - Universidade Europeia , whilst pursuing her musical career.

She dated Manchester City player and International Portuguese player Ruben Dias from 2018 to 2021.

Discography

Albums

Singles

As featured artist

References

Portuguese pop singers
21st-century Portuguese women singers
1999 births
Living people
English-language singers from Portugal
Portuguese women singer-songwriters
Singers from Lisbon
Association footballers' wives and girlfriends
Women pop singers